Cortez Groves (born March 25, 1978) is an American former professional basketball player who is best known for his time spent in the Australian National Basketball League (NBL).

After two years at Kansas State, Groves played in the International Basketball Association for the Salina Rattlers during the 2000–01 season. He finished the season in France with Aix Maurienne Savoie Basket, and then returned to the team for the first half of the 2001–02 season.

For the 2002–03 season, Groves moved to Australia to play for the Wollongong Hawks. After a stint in the ABA with the Kansas City Knights during the 2003–04 season, Groves moved to Argentina for the 2004–05 season, where he played for Atenas de Córdoba. He returned to Australia for the 2005–06 season, re-joining the Wollongong Hawks. He continued on with the Hawks for the 2006–07 season and then joined the South Dragons for the 2007–08 season. He returned to the Dragons for a second season, but he was cut in December 2008 due to injury. He returned to Australia for the 2009–10 season to play for the Adelaide 36ers.

Groves had his final professional stint in 2011, playing for the Brisbane Spartans in the SEABL.

References

External links
Adelaide 36ers profile
NBL stats
French LNB profile

1978 births
Living people
Adelaide 36ers players
American expatriate basketball people in Argentina
American expatriate basketball people in Australia
American expatriate basketball people in France
American men's basketball players
Basketball players from Missouri
Guards (basketball)
Kansas State Wildcats men's basketball players
Moberly Greyhounds men's basketball players
People from Raytown, Missouri
South Dragons players
Wollongong Hawks players